Barry Trevor Thomas (21 July 1937 – 5 January 2018) was a New Zealand rugby union player. A prop, Thomas represented  and, briefly,  at a provincial level. He was a member of the New Zealand national side, the All Blacks, in 1962 and 1964. All four of his appearances for the All Blacks were in internationals against Australia played in New Zealand.

Thomas died in the Auckland suburb of Epsom on 5 January 2018.

References

1937 births
2018 deaths
Rugby union players from Auckland
People educated at Otahuhu College
New Zealand rugby union players
New Zealand international rugby union players
Auckland rugby union players
Wellington rugby union players
Rugby union props